Nosism, from Latin nos 'we', is the practice of using the pronoun we to refer to oneself when expressing a personal opinion.

Depending on the person using the nosism different uses can be distinguished:

The royal we or pluralis majestatis 

The royal we (pluralis majestatis) refers to a single person holding a high office, such as a monarch, bishop, or pope.

The editorial we 
The editorial we is a similar phenomenon, in which an editorial columnist in a newspaper or a similar commentator in another medium refers to themself as we when giving their opinion. Here, the writer casts themself in the role of a spokesperson: either for the media institution that employs them, or more generally on behalf of the party or body of citizens who agree with the commentary.

The author's we or pluralis modestiae 
Similar to the editorial we, pluralis modestiae is the practice common in mathematical and scientific literature of referring to a generic third person by we (instead of the more common one or the informal you):
 By adding four and five, we obtain nine.
 We are thus led also to a definition of "time" in physics. – Albert Einstein

We in this sense often refers to "the reader and the author," since the author often assumes that the reader knows and agrees with certain principles or previous theorems for the sake of brevity (or, if not, the reader is prompted to look them up).

This practice is discouraged in the hard sciences, social sciences, humanities, and technical writing because it fails to distinguish between sole authorship and co-authorship.

The kindergarten we 
The kindergarten, or patronizing we is sometimes used in addressing instead of you, suggesting that the addressee is not alone in their situation such as "We won't lose our mittens today." This usage is emotionally non-neutral, but can carry condescending, ironic, praising, or other connotations, depending on intonation.

The hospital we 
This is sometimes employed by healthcare workers when addressing their patients; for example, "How are we feeling today?"

The non-confrontative we 
In distinction to the patronizing we is the non-confrontative we used in T–V languages such as Spanish where the phrase ¿Cómo estamos? (literally, "How are we?") is sometimes used to avoid both over-familiarity and under-formality among near-peer acquaintances. In Spanish, the indicative "we" form is also often used instead of the imperative for giving instructions, such as in recipes: batimos las claras a punto de nieve (we beat the egg whites until stiff).

The self-talk we 
In engaging in self-talk, where the speaker is thinking or saying things to themselves, it can be natural to use the pronoun we, in the sense of "I," the mind, the thinker or speaker, and you, the body doing the action. Some people then extend this self-talk we into conversations with others, like we went to the store instead of I went to the store.

References 

Personal pronouns
Sociolinguistics
Grammatical number
Etiquette